"Marvin & Chardonnay" is a song by American rapper Big Sean featuring fellow American rappers Kanye West and Roscoe Dash, released as the second single from the former's debut studio album, Finally Famous. The song was written by the artists alongside producer Andrew "Pop" Wansel with additional production from Mike Dean. It was sent to urban contemporary radio stations on July 12, 2011, and to Rhythmic radio on July 26, 2011. In the chorus of the song, Roscoe Dash references late American R&B/soul music singer Marvin Gaye and white wine chardonnay. The song was originally called "Marvin Gaye & Chardonnay".

Background 
Big Sean spoke about how the song came together in an interview with Billboard, saying,
It was all Kanye’s creation. He gave me the beat, Roscoe was already on it. He was in Paris, I was in LA and he hit me and was like like, ‘yo, you should put this on your album.’ It was perfect. It was a key necessity for it. We wrote our verses over the phone and just knocked it out.

Music video 
The music video for "Marvin & Chardonnay" premiered on September 7, 2011, on Vevo. It was directed by Hype Williams. It features appearances from both Kanye West and Roscoe Dash. He also premiered on the video on BET's 106 & Park the week of, reaching number one on the countdown. The video is similar to other Hype Williams directed videos: Twista's "Give It Up" and Kanye West's "Gold Digger".

Chart performance
Marvin & Chardonnay debuted at number 88 on the US Billboard Hot 100 chart on the week of August 5, 2011. On the week October 8, 2011, the single later reached its peak position at number 32 on the chart. On September 23, 2014, the song was certified platinum by the Recording Industry Association of America (RIAA) for sales of over a million copies in the United States.

Track listing 
Digital download (as an album-track only)
"Marvin & Chardonnay" (featuring Kanye West and Roscoe Dash) – 3:43

Charts

Weekly charts

Weekly charts

Certifications

Radio history

References 

2011 singles
Big Sean songs
Kanye West songs
Roscoe Dash songs
GOOD Music singles
Songs written by Kanye West
Songs about alcohol
Music videos directed by Hype Williams
Songs written by Pop Wansel
2011 songs
Songs written by Big Sean
Songs written by Roscoe Dash

Song recordings produced by Mike Dean (record producer)